Acetivibrio is a genus of Clostridia bacteria.

Species
Acetivibrio aldrichii
Acetivibrio alkalicellulosi
Acetivibrio cellulolyticus
Acetivibrio cellulosolvens
Acetivibrio clariflavus
Acetivibrio ethanolgignens
Acetivibrio mesophilus
Acetivibrio saccincola
Acetivibrio straminisolvens
Acetivibrio thermocellus

References

External links
https://web.archive.org/web/20070926235145/http://www.dsmz.de/microorganisms/bacterial_nomenclature_info.php?genus=ACETIVIBRIO
https://web.archive.org/web/20070608113739/http://www.bacterio.cict.fr/a/acetivibrio.html

Clostridiaceae
Bacteria genera